Raphael Orlando Tate (born February 18, 1984) is an American singer, songwriter, dancer, musician, record producer and bandleader.  His debut single "With Every Beat of My Heart" (released in late 2017) peaked at number 25 on Billboard's Dance Club Songs in America.

Early life
He grew up in Prince George's County, Maryland with 10 siblings. Tate's musicality originated from his religious family background.  He was inspired early on by his father Robert and his mother Patricia who lead worship services in their local network of churches.  His father also played saxophone and sang professionally for R&B groups before devoting himself to the church as an assistant pastor.  His older brother Joel is also a professional drummer and percussionist.

As a child, Tate was very quiet and shy, and struggled with the divorce of his parents.  As he entered high school, he discovered more confidence as his talents as both a musician and athlete began to develop at Crossland High School.  His performance on the basketball court earned him many scholarship opportunities to play in college.  Music performance, however, evolved into Tate's greatest passion.  He joined marching band in high school, and learned how to read, write, arrange, and compose music.  He started out as a percussionist and continued on to learn the tuba/sousaphone. Tate excelled rapidly on the tuba.  He accepted a music scholarship to attend Morgan State University in Baltimore County, Maryland.  During this period, he was featured in the (2002) film Head of State performing with a brass band composed of his colleagues. After college Tate travelled the world and eventually settled on the island of Cyprus.  He lived there for several years while developing his craft and ultimately matured into an all around producer, singer, and bandleader.  Eventually he was discovered by Eve Efrat (owner of Public Relations firm Arieli) and Jason Dauman.

Musical releases
Tate's song "With Every Beat of My Heart" was released in 2017 and (as of January 2018) has peaked at number 15 on the UK Commercial Pop Chart, and 25 on Billboard's American Dance Club Songs Chart. The song was originally written by Arthur Baker, Lotti Golden, and Tommy Faragher, and made famous by Taylor Dayne when she released it in 1989.  Tate remade the song with the help of Jason Dauman, Dave Audé, Joe Gauthreaux, DJ Lean, Scotty Boy, and Dan Boots.

Tate also recently released a single entitled "Back To Your Heart", as well as a cover of the Oliver Cheatham song "Get Down Saturday Night".

His single "Samba Comigo" recently charted on Billboard.

In 2020, he released a new single, "She Like Dat (Smile Again Riddim)".

In 2021, he released single entitled "A Fool in Love". "A Fool In Love" is a sampled from Big time British reggae, roots reggae band Aswad : produced by  Brinsley Forde's son, Recording Academy Grammy nominated producer Jermaine Ajang Forde.

Also he released a single in honor of his late mother Patricia Ann Tate's life and legacy being she passed away suddenly May 13, 2020 "Everyday is Mother's Day" 

May 20, 2021 He released "Blessed"
Rapidly becoming a favourite among major music tastemakers in the UK and in his native US, Cyprus-based artist RAPHAEL TATE may be known as the ‘Prince of Soul’, but he has returned to his reggae roots for his self-written single ‘Blessed’.
Over a rocksteady-style riddim, Raphael takes a step and reflects how fortunate he is for his life. ‘Blessed' is also an ode for everyone to celebrate their time on this Earth, especially with the unprecedented times of 2020. Upon its release, 'Blessed’ received a seal of approval from BBC Radio 1 Xtra's Seani B and Award-winning producer Jazzward on Seani's Spotlight Sessions. 

July 1, 2021 BBC Radio 1 Xtra featured Raphael Tate for international Reggae day hosted by SeaniB. Singing a remix of Reggae & lovers rock Legend's Beres Hammond, hit "Rock Away", Tate, was saluted by the legend himself.

October 8, 2021 Raphael Tate released a new reggae song called Fear No Evil. ‘FEAR. NO. EVIL’ greets us with a sweet Champion riddim, reminiscent of the eighties, where the Maryland, United States born artist cast any negative entity aside, through a toe-curling soulful falsetto, encouraging others to stand up against obstacles of any form. Staring the devil right in the face, Raphael's latest single ‘FEAR. NO. EVIL’ has all the strength to blast any darkness/troubles away, firmly cementing his place on your radar.

November 20, 2021 American gospel Jazz musician Jeff Majors has paid homage to fellow jazz musician, the late Benard Ighner by revamping his 1974 Quincy Jones-produced single, Everything Must Change. Jeff Majors version of ‘Everything Must Change features fast-rising soulful powerhouse, Raphael Tate who gives an outstanding heartfelt vocal performance, adding a glowingly magical touch to the record. Jeff Majors was in fact mentioned by a good friend - and Raphael Tate's father - Robert Tate, who was also a creditable jazz, R&B and soul musician who sang with The Unifics. After losing touch for many years, Jeff reconnected with Robert, where he learned of Raphael's burgeoning music career. Impressed by Raphael's artistry, Jeff invited him to collaborate on the re-make of 'Everything Must Change'.

April 15, 2022 Raphael Tate released "Share My Life" produced by Brinsley Forde's legacy, Recording Academy Grammy nominated producer Jermaine Brinsley Forde Ajang music and Terrence Chamberlin (Bluesteel Productions). The self-penned single is a reminder to love and cherish loved ones - and never take them for granted. Raphael's robustly soulful vocals leads the jubilant bounce of a soul/reggae/Afrobeat fusion, produced by Terrence Chamberlin (Bluesteel Studio) and Jermaine Forde (Ajang Music). A multi-Grammy nominated producer and the son of the legendary Brinsley Forde from Aswad and the star of the British film Babylon, Jermaine has worked with the likes of Julian Marley and Black Uhuru and also produced Raphael's 2020 BBC London/ BBC Radio 1Xtra-approved single, "A Fool In Love".

May 13, 2022 Raphael Tate released "Lord I Need You Near" composed by Raphael Tate. Following on from the release of single, ‘Share My Life’, produced by Jermaine Forde (the son of Brinsley Forde from the legendary reggae group Aswad), RAPHAEL TATE makes a quick return with single, ‘Lord I Need You Near.’Dedicated to Raphael’s mother, Patricia Ann Tate (1953-2020), ‘Lord I Need You Near’ is the first single that Raphael entirely composed and produced – from arranging the strings, writing the lyrics to performing the lead backing vocals. To be a conductor and composer has always been Raphael's lifelong dream – and what better way to fulfil a dream by paying a tribute to a loved-one.

The stunning ballad features a stellar line-up who adds the final touches to the production. Award-winning jazz harpist Jeff Majors, who collaborated with Raphael for 2021 single, ‘Everything Must Change’, provides the spine-tingling magic right from the beginning of the emotive piece. Acclaimed bassist Mark A Walker adds a pleasing full-bodied tone to the heavenly arrangements. Mark has worked with the likes of Will Downing, Queen of Contemporary Gospel Music, Yolanda Adams and multi award-winning Gospel artist, Richard Smallwood who had a hit with single, ‘Total Praise.’

‘Lord I Need You Near’ was further brought to life by Ukraine's Kaska Records Orchestra who provides breathtakingly stunning live instrumentation, a perfect platform for the UK-based singer/songwriter to showcase his powerhouse vocals, pleading for comfort from the loss of his mother. This single also serves as a soothing ode for everyone who lost a loved one, particularly during the pandemic.

Personal life
He has a son named Micah Isaiah Tate.

In 2020, during the COVID-19 pandemic, Tate was unable to return to his home in Cyprus, and performed via live streams while staying with friends in the UK.

References

1984 births
Living people
American bandleaders
American gospel singers
American soul singers
American male dancers
American male singer-songwriters
Record producers from Maryland
Singer-songwriters from Maryland